Dalton Mills is a 19th century Grade II* Victorian former textile mill located in Keighley, West Yorkshire, England. Previously used as a set for Peaky Blinders, it was once claimed to be the largest textile mill in Yorkshire, massing over 2,000 employees. The internal parts of the building were destroyed by a large fire that broke out on 3 March 2022.

History
Dalton Mills was constructed in 1869 by Joseph Craven and was designed as a worsted mill and as a replacement for the former Strong Close Mill, owned by Rachel Leach. The mill was named after Dalton, who was the manager employed by Leach. It was said to be the largest textile mill in Yorkshire, having over 2,000 employees.

Due to the decline of the textile industry, the mill was virtually empty up until 2004. John Craven, the great-great-grandson of Joseph Craven, eventually sold the mill to Magna Holdings to ensure its permanence.

In 2015, the building was taken off English Heritage's at-risk register after being partially restored due to falling in disrepair.

The building was used as a set for multiple series, including Peaky Blinders and Downton Abbey.

2011 fire
On 1 January 2011 at around 6:50 pm GMT, a fire broke out at Dalton Mills with around 100 firefighters at the scene, destroying parts of the building. The West Yorkshire Fire Service treated the outbreak as "suspicious" with Chris Clarke stating that the fire was started by a group of people who were not permitted to be there. The outbreak was later confirmed to be an arson attack by copper thieves as they attempted to burn the insulation off so as to steal the metal.

2022 fire
On 3 March 2022 at around 12 pm GMT, an inferno broke out, engulfing and damaging the entire building and completely destroying the interior, along with the floor and roof. More than 100 firefighters were reported at the scene and were sent with 20 pumps, according to the West Yorkshire Fire and Rescue Service. The fire service informed nearby residents of the fire, telling them to keep windows and doors shut and to avoid travelling. The Leisure Centre in Keighley was opened up by the Bradford council to provide shelter to affected residents. The fire was deemed extinguished on 6 March at 3:30 pm GMT. The incident was described to be "a sad loss to the Yorkshire filmmaking landscape" by Richard Knight with Screen Yorkshire. West Yorkshire Police stated that five suspects were arrested over the suspected arson attack and were being questioned. They were later released on bail, with further inquiries pending.

After the fire, it was assumed that the mill would have to be torn down due to safety concerns. However, an inspection conducted by Historic England confirmed that the mill is stable and does not need to be demolished, but stated that the future of it has yet to be decided.

See also
Listed buildings in Keighley

References

External links

Buildings and structures in West Yorkshire
Grade II* listed buildings in West Yorkshire
Textile mills in West Yorkshire
1869 establishments in England
2022 fires in the United Kingdom